Telgárt (called Švermovo in 1948–1990) is a village and municipality in Brezno District, in the Banská Bystrica Region of central Slovakia.

Etymology
The name is of German origin: Tiergarten (initially a hunting area). In 1948, the village was named after a Czech communist resistance fighter and participant in Slovak National Uprising, Jan Šverma. In 1990, the residents of the village returned to the original name claiming that it is still in use and Šverma never fought in Telgárt.

History
In historical records the village was first mentioned in 1326 , in 1549  it was referred as Thygart.

Geography

The village lies at an altitude of 881 metres and covers an area of 55.974 km2. It has population of about 1,531 people. The Hron river rises in the cadastral area of the village, under the Kráľova hoľa mountain.

References

Villages and municipalities in Brezno District